Julidochromis marksmithi is a species of cichlid from the tribe Lamprologini of the subfamily Pseudocrenilabrinae which is endemic to Lake Tanganyika where it occurs on the Tanzanian shore around Kiplipi in Nkasi District.

Etymology
The specific name of this fish honours the aquarist Mark Smith.

References

marksmithi
Taxa named by Warren E. Burgess
Fish described in 2014